Kaikki hedelmät (All the Fruits) is the third compilation album by the Finnish rock group CMX. It was published on 2008-11-05. Unlike previous two triple compilation albums it concentrates on hits and singles. It includes two new songs that are to be released also separately.

Track listing

CD 1 
 Kivinen kirja (previously unreleased)
 Ainomieli
 Elokuun kruunu
 Ruoste
 Kultanaamio
 Kirosäkeet
 Pelasta maailma
 Nimetön
 Aamutähti
 Vallat ja väet
 Siivekäs
 Ei yksikään
 Sillanrakentaja

CD 2 
 Rautalankaa (previously unreleased)
 Jatkuu niin kuin sade
 Meidän syntimme
 Puuvertaus
 Pohjoista leveyttä
 Minne paha haudattiin
 Minun sydämeni on särkynyt
 Silmien takana
 Melankolia
 Palvelemaan konetta
 Kauneus pettää
 Uusi ihmiskunta
 Kain
 Kuolemaantuomitut

External links 
 Rautalankaa song in EMIs Jukebox

CMX (band) albums
2008 compilation albums